Denise Martin is a cricketer.

Denise Martin may also refer to:

Denise Martin (reality TV contestant) in Survivor: China
Denise Martin (curler) in 2001 Canadian Olympic Curling Trials
Denise Martin, wife and manager of Eric Martin (musician)